Avgerinos Katranas (born 20 February 1988) is a Greek footballer currently playing for Nestos Chrysoupoli F.C. in the Football League 2 as a  centre back.

Career
Katranas began his career in the Panathinaikos FC youth academy and played there until June 2008. He had also played for Panserraikos F.C.,  Panetolikos F.C., Koropi F.C.,  Agia Paraskevi, Apollon Smyrni F.C., Korinthos F.C. and Vyzas F.C. .

References

External links
Scoresway Profile
Myplayer.gr Profile
Profile at Onsports.gr

1988 births
Living people
Footballers from Xanthi
Greek footballers
Panathinaikos F.C. players
Panserraikos F.C. players
Panetolikos F.C. players
Apollon Smyrnis F.C. players
Korinthos F.C. players
Vyzas F.C. players
Association football central defenders